Pupina complanata is a species of land snail with an operculum, a terrestrial gastropod mollusk in the family Pupinidae. This species is found in the Marshall Islands and Micronesia.

References 

 Discoverlife info

Pupina
Taxonomy articles created by Polbot